Adiantum hispidulum, commonly known as rough maidenhair fern or five-fingered jack,  is a small fern in the family Pteridaceae of widespread distribution. It is found in Africa, Australia, Polynesia, Malesia, New Zealand and other Pacific Islands.  Its fronds rise in clumps from rhizomes among rocks or in the soil in sheltered areas.

Taxonomy
Adiantum hispidulum was first described by Swedish botanist Olof Swartz in 1802. Its species name is derived from the Latin hispis "hair" and means "minutely hairy". Five-fingered jack is an alternative vernacular name.

Description
Adiantum hispidulum grows in tufts or clumps among rocks or from the ground, its fronds arising from the short dark clumped rhizomes. The dark stipe measures up to 45 cm (18 in) in length. The fronds are divided into long and short narrow triangular or elliptic pinnae, each of which is divided again into smaller roughly rectangular, diamond-, or fan-shaped pinnules. Each pinnule may have 1 to 20 sori along its margins underneath. Young growth may have a pinkish tinge before it matures into the dark green foliage.

Distribution and habitat
The species ranges from tropical Eastern Africa, including South Africa, Mozambique, Malawi, Kenya and Tanzania, as well as Madagascar and the Comoros, Mauritius, to Asia through Malesia to all states of Australia (with the exception of Tasmania), as well as New Zealand and Pacific islands. A common plant, Adiantum hispidulum is often seen growing in moist areas. In Australia it is found near rocks, in rainforest or open forest.

Apart from its native range, it has naturalized in Macaronesia (the Azores, Madeira and Canary Islands), the Southeastern United States and Hawaii.

Cultivation
Adiantum hispidulum is grown as an ornamental plant that adapts readily to cultivation, although may be slow growing. It is more tolerant of sun and drying out than other fern species. According to the Royal Horticultural Society Adiantum hispidulum is hardy down to -5C to -10C.

References 

hispidulum
Ferns of Asia
Ferns of Africa
Ferns of Australasia
Ferns of Oceania
Ferns of Australia
Ferns of New Zealand
Flora of East Tropical Africa
Flora of Malawi
Flora of Mozambique
Flora of South Africa
Flora of the Western Indian Ocean
Flora of Lord Howe Island
Flora of the Tubuai Islands
Flora of the Pacific
Flora of Malesia
Garden plants of Asia
Garden plants of Africa
Plants described in 1801
Taxa named by Olof Swartz